Saurorictus is an extinct genus of Late Permian captorhinid known from Western Cape Province of South Africa.

Description
Saurorictus is known from the holotype SAM PK-8666, three-dimensionally preserved nearly complete skull and few postcranial fragments. This specimen represents one of the most complete captorhinid from the Late Permian.

It was collected from the Hoedemaker Member, Teekloof Formation of the lower Beaufort Group, dating to the early-middle Wuchiapingian stage (or alternatively middle Tatarian stage) of the early Lopingian Series, about 260.5-255 million years ago. It was found in the Leeukloof 43 farm in the Beaufort West District of the Western Cape Province and referred to the Tropidostoma Assemblage Zone.

Etymology
Saurorictus was first named by Sean P. Modesto and Roger M. H. Smith in 2001 and the type species is Saurorictus australis. The generic name is derived from sauros, Greek for "lizard", and rictus, Latin for "display of teeth" or "smile", thus the meaning is "lizard-smile". The specific name australis, meaning "southern", refers to the fact that this is the southernmost captorhinid to date.

References

Extinct animals of Africa
Permian reptiles of Africa
Fossil taxa described in 2001
Captorhinids
Prehistoric reptile genera

it:Saurorictus